Uncatena was a sidewheel steamer operating as a ferry serving the island of Martha's Vineyard during the beginning of the twentieth century.

Uncatena was built in Wilmington, DE in 1902, and named after Uncatena Island, one of the Elizabeth Islands. She was 652 tons. She started service immediately to Martha's Vineyard for the New Bedford, Martha's Vineyard, and Nantucket Steamboat Co. Uncatena was the first steamer built with a steel hull to serve the island and the first with a propeller. The paddles were housed in the superstructure, and an outline of the paddlebox appeared on its sides.

The Vineyard Gazette wrote in June 1961:

Capt. Marshall (evidently Francis J. Marshall (1857–1933) of Edgartown) and Capt. Sylvia were both masters of Uncatena.

Uncatena was retired from service in 1928, after 26 years of operation.

References 

Paddle steamers
Ferries of Massachusetts
Maritime history of the United States
Martha's Vineyard
Ships built in Wilmington, Delaware
Steamboats of Nantucket Sound
Transportation in Dukes County, Massachusetts
1902 ships